The 2001 TennisCup Vlaanderen was a women's tennis tournament played on outdoor clay courts in Antwerp, Belgium that was part of the Tier V category of the 2001 WTA Tour. It was the eighth edition of the tournament and was held from 14 May until 20 May 2001. Fifth-seeded Barbara Rittner won the singles title and the accompanying $16,000 first-prize money.

Finals

Singles

 Barbara Rittner defeated  Klára Koukalová, 6–3, 6–2
 It was Rittner's 1st singles title of the year and the 2nd and last of her career.

Doubles

 Els Callens /  Virginia Ruano Pascual defeated  Kristie Boogert /  Miriam Oremans, 6–3, 3–6, 6–4

External links
 ITF tournament edition details
 WTA tournament draws

Antwerp
Belgian Open (tennis)
May 2001 sports events in Europe
2001 in Belgian women's sport
2001 in Belgian tennis